Alfredo Arce Carpio (19 March 1941 – 9 February 2001) was a Bolivian politician, legal figure, and intellectual. He studied law at the Universidad Mayor de San Andrés. Arce Carpio went on to become a judge, later serving as General Counsel of the Presidency and congressman in Bolivia.

In the field of politics, Arce Carpio held various positions in the first government of Hugo Banzer Suárez, including Minister of Government, Justice, and Immigration, and Minister Without Portfolio. In 1987, he was involved in a drug scandal, which led to his suspension from membership in the Nationalist Democratic Action (ADN).

References

1941 births
2001 deaths
2001 murders in Bolivia
20th-century Bolivian judges
20th-century Bolivian politicians
Assassinated Bolivian politicians
Deaths from asphyxiation
Government ministers of Bolivia
Higher University of San Andrés alumni
Members of the Chamber of Deputies (Bolivia)
Interior ministers of Bolivia
Nationalist Democratic Action politicians
People from La Paz
People murdered in Bolivia
Revolutionary Nationalist Movement politicians
Justice ministers of Bolivia